Anantapur district officially: Anantapuramu district is one of the eight districts in the Rayalaseema region of the Indian state of Andhra Pradesh. The district headquarters is located in Anantapur city. It is one of the driest places in South India.  census of India, it was the largest district in the state by area and with a population of 2,241,105. Later in the year 2022, as part of re-organisation of districts, Sri Sathya Sai district was carved out and so its area and population reduced by half.

Etymology 
The name Anantapur was named after a big tank called Anantasagara. It existed during reign of Vijayanagara Empire, which was named after Ananthamma, wife of Bukkaraya, one of the founders of the empire.

History 
Gooty fort was a stronghold of the Marathas, but was taken from them by Hyder Ali. In 1789 it was ceded by his son Tipu Sultan to the Nizam of Hyderabad, and in 1800 the nizam ceded the surrounding districts to the British in payment for a subsidiary British force. In 1882, Anantapuram district was formed by carving out from Bellary district.

Geography 
It is bounded on the north by Kurnool district and Nandyal district , on the east by Kadapa district, and South by  Sri Sathya Sai district and on the southwest and west by Chitradurga district And Bellary district in   Karnataka state. It is part of Rayalaseema region on the state. Its northern and central portions are a high plateau, generally undulating, with large granite rocks or low hill ranges rising occasionally above its surface. Six rivers flow within the district: Penna, Chithravathi, Vedavathi, Papagni, Swarnamukhi, and Thadakaleru. The district receives an average annual rainfall of 381 millimetres. Anantapur district mostly falls under the rainshadow region of the Western Ghats, with a Hot semi-arid climate. Red soil and vertisol are the most common soils. The driest parts of India after the Thar desert are in this region, as well as adjoining Chitradurga district and Ballari district of Karnataka, and parts of Kurnool district and Kadapa district.

Anantapur connects Hyderabad and Bangalore through National Highway 7. Kempegowda International Airport, Bengaluru is the nearest international airport to Ananthapuramu town. Other small-scale domestic airports are there in neighboring districts of Kurnool and Kadapa which are around 150 km and 200 km away respectively.

Demographics 

 census of India, Anantapur district has a population of 4,081,148 with 9,68,160 households, ranking it as the 7th most populous district in the state. Anantapur has a sex ratio of 977 females for every 1000 males, and a literacy rate of 64.28%. Urban population in the district is 28.9% of total population.

After bifurcation Anantapur district had a population of 2,241,105, of which 753,354 (33.62%) lived in urban areas. Anantapur district had a sex ratio of 978 females per 1000 males. Scheduled Castes and Scheduled Tribes make up 3,34,142 (14.91%) and 70,161 (3.13%) of the population respectively.

Language

At the time of the 2011 census, 84.59% of the population spoke Telugu, 9.64% Urdu, 3.03% Kannada and 1.42% Lambadi as their first language.

Economy 

The primary, secondary and tertiary sectors of the district contribute ,  and  respectively to the GDDP.

Agriculture and allied services Paddy and Groundnut are major agricultural crops in the district. When it comes to horticulture Banana and Papaya are heavily cultivated.

Industries
Industries like Constructions, Manufactures and Electricity are major contributors for GVA. Anantapur has a major potential for development of industry due to its strategic location between Bengaluru – Chennai and Bengaluru – Hyderabad routes and availability of vast tracts of land. In 2006 the Indian government named Anantapur one of the country's 250 most backward districts (out of a total of 640). It is one of the thirteen districts in Andhra Pradesh currently receiving funds from the Backward Regions Grant Fund Programme (BRGF).

Minerals
Anantapur is a major producer of dolomite and iron ore minerals.

Power plants
Solar thermal power plant of 50 MW was commissioned at this village under Jawaharlal Nehru National Solar Mission which was named as Megha Solar Plant. It is one of the 7 solar thermal plants in the country.

Tadipatri region in Anantapur is an industrialised town famous for Granite and Cement production. Ultra Tech Cements a unit of Industrial major Larsen & Toubro has a major Cement production unit near the town.

 Agriculture

The economy is principally agrarian with a developing industrial sector. Anantapur receives very less rainfall due to its location in the rain shadow area of Indian Peninsula. Prominent crops include groundnut, sunflower, rice, cotton, maize, chillies, sesame, and sugarcane. Silk trade, limestone quarrying, iron and diamond mining. Anantapur town is known as Groundnut City in reference to the neighbouring Bengaluru being called as Garden City.

Religious tourism

The Gooty Fort, also known as Ravadurg, is a ruined fort located on a hill in the Gooty town of Anantapur Andhra Pradesh, India. The word Gooty (locally pronounced "Gutti") is derived from the town's original name, Gowthampuri. It is one of the centrally protected Monuments of National Importance.

Administrative divisions 

The District has three Revenue Divisions: Anantapur, Guntakal and Kalyandurg. These revenue divisions are further divided into 32 mandals.

The mandals of the district are listed in the following table:

Parliament segments

Anantapur (Lok Sabha constituency), Hindupur (Lok Sabha constituency)

Assembly segments
Anantapur and Hindupur Lok Sabha constituency comprises the following Legislative Assembly segments:

Erstwhile Talukas in District

Towns in District 

The Following are the towns in old district.

Transport 

Education 
The primary and secondary school education is imparted by government, aided and private schools, under the School Education Department of the state. As per the school information report for the academic year 2015–16, there are a total of 5,024 schools. They include, 28 government, 3,435 mandal and zilla parishads, 4 residential, 1,154 private, 25 model, 62 Kasturba Gandhi Balika Vidyalaya (KGBV), 261 municipal and 55 other types of schools. The total number of students enrolled in primary, upper primary and high schools of the district are 563,710. The total number of students enrolled in primary, upper primary and high schools of the district are 563,266.

When it comes to Union (Central) government schools, Jawahar Navodaya Vidyalaya (JNV) is located nearby Lepakshi, Sri Satyasai district but it serves both Sri Satyasai and Ananthapuramu districts as Lepakshi was part of Ananthapuramu district earlier and after bifurcation, a new JNV is yet to be established in new Ananthapuramu district. Also there are three Central schools (Kendriya Vidyalayas) in the district, located in Guntakal, Gooty and Ananthapuramu.

Anantapur is an important education centre with many educational, schools, colleges and universities situated in the district. Anantapur city has become a major hub with many education institutions situated in its vicinity. Some of the institutions include Sri Krishnadevaraya University, JNTU Ananthapur, Sri Sathya Sai University, Government Medical College, Government polytechnic anantapur, Srinivasa Ramanujan Institute of Technology, Government Polytechnic Hindupur, Gates Institute of Technology, Central University of Andhra Pradesh, 
Dalavai Chalapathi Rao

Temples 
The following sixty five temples under the management of Endowments Department

Notable people 

 Neelam Sanjiva Reddy, President of India, Lok sabha Speaker, former Chief Minister of Andhra Pradesh and Central Minister
 T. Nagi Reddy, Communist leader
 Syed Shahabuddin (cricketer), first class crickter
 Rallapalli Ananta Krishna Sharma, singer
 Sujeeth, director, writer

References

External links 

 District official website

 
Districts of Andhra Pradesh
Rayalaseema
1882 establishments in India